The Spartak Moscow  – Dynamo Kyiv derby is a major international football rivalry between former Soviet giants Spartak Moscow and Dynamo Kyiv that developed in the Soviet Top League.

A Spartak – Kyiv match often hosts the biggest crowd of all Soviet Top League matches, especially after the last league reorganization in 1970. The match became more popular even than the Oldest Russian derby between Dynamo Moscow and Spartak that had been the longest-running top event of the league since its establishment in 1936.

The two clubs were the most successful in the Soviet Top League, with Dynamo having won 13 titles to Spartak's 12. Spartak, however, has a better match record. As of 1 August 2008, of 132 matches Spartak have won 60 and lost 48.

The contest emerged as a derby in 1976, when Dynamo beat Spartak, relegating them from the top flight.

Besides the football competition, the derby has some political background in Russian-Ukrainian relations. This has been especially marked since 1991 when Ukraine became an independent state with its own football league.

Head to head record

Records 
 Largest scores by Spartak: 5–1 (1940); 4–0 (1955, 1958).
 Largest scores by Dynamo: 4–1 (1950, 1966, 1972, 2008 [twice]); 3–0 (1968, 1978, 2008).
 Most goals scored in a single match: 7 (4–3) (1957)

Streaks 
Longest Spartak winning streaks
 : 5 (4 league + 1 cup match).
 : 5 (4 league + 1 cup match).
 : 5 (all league).

Longest Spartak lossless streak
 : 14 wins + 9 ties in 18 league + 5 cup matches.

Longest Dynamo winning streak
 : 6 (all league).

Longest Dynamo lossless streak
 : 9 wins + 5 ties in 14 league + 4 cup matches.

All official matches

Soviet Cup

CIS/United Tournament

Major honours 

 Other includes Football Cup of the Ukrainian SSR and Football Championship of the Ukrainian SSR.

References 

Football derbies in Russia
FC Spartak Moscow
FC Dynamo Kyiv
Ukrainian football derbies
Football in the Soviet Union
Russia–Ukraine relations
1936 establishments in the Soviet Union